Tombola is a lottery-style board game which originated in Southern Italy. A variation of the game is a popular form of raffle in the UK and elsewhere.

By region

Italy 

In Italy, a tombola is a traditional board game, first played in the city of Naples in the eighteenth century. It is similar to the game of bingo. It is mostly played at Christmas time, and prizes are often only symbolic or low cash pots.
The player will purchase cards based on fixed cost decided at the start of the game (usually 20c or similar small coin).
You can buy as many cards as you wish.
The money is then divided into 5 prize lots with increasing value:
 Ambo - 2 numbers on a single horizontal row.
 Terno - 3 numbers on a single horizontal row.
 Quaterna - 4 numbers on a single horizontal row.
 Cinquina - 5 numbers on a single horizontal row.
 Tombola - the whole card has been filled.

The players who reach the above prizes should call them out and collect the lot. Multiple callers for the lot require it to be divided between the winners.

United Kingdom 

In the United Kingdom, a tombola is a form of raffle in which prizes are pre-assigned to winning tickets. Typically numbered raffle tickets are used, with prizes allocated to all those ending in a particular digit (traditionally a five or a zero). Players pay for a ticket, which they then draw at random from a hat or tombola drum, and can instantly see whether they have won a prize. Tombolas are popular at events such as village fêtes and coffee mornings, when it is expected that not all the players will be present at the end of the event.

United States 
In the United States, fair style fundraisers may have booths with prizes that can be won in a manner similar to UK tombola. Players pay to select a folded paper from a container, and unfold it to determine if—and perhaps what—they have won. Typically, winning tickets will be identified by the ending digits of the number on the paper (for instance, –00). Prizes may be distributed by letting the player make a selection or by proactively marking prizes with the winning numbers.

India 
In India, the game is often misspelled as Tambola, although Tombola is the official spelling. Tickets are distributed among the players and the presenter announces the numbers in an exciting way. One by one the players claim the prizes and win either real money (which is decided before starting the game) or a gift.

Prizes that can be claimed while playing Tombola are:

 Early Five: A player can claim early five when he strikes the first five numbers in the ticket.
 Four Corners: To claim Four Corners a player should strike Top Row: 1st & 5th Number; Bottom Row: 1st and 5th Number.
 Top Line: A player can claim top line when all the numbers on first-line are struck in the ticket.
 Middle Line: To claim middle-line a player should have all the middle line numbers struck.
 Bottom Line: To claim bottom-line a player should have all the bottom line numbers struck.
 Pyramid: Just as its name, Top Row: 3rd Number; Middle Row: 2nd, 4th Number; Bottom Row: 1st, 3rd, 5th Number are struck then a player can claim pyramid.
 Center: A player can claim center when the 3rd number of the middle row is being cut.
 Circle: Whosoever 3rd number of the Top Row, 2nd, 4th number of the Middle Row, 3rd number of the Bottom row are struck can claim Circle. 
 Breakfast: Numbers in Column 1, 2 and 3. It includes numbers from 1 to 29.
 Lunch: Numbers in Column 4, 5 and 6. It covers numbers from 30 to 59 in a ticket.
 Dinner: Numbers in Column 7, 8 and 9. It covers numbers from 60 to 90 in a ticket.
 Minor: Any number from 1- 49 is included in this. 
 Major: Any number from 50-90 is included in this. 
 Full-House: Players whose all 15 numbers are cut can claim the winning prize.

References 

Lotteries
Italian games